The 1988 French Open was a tennis tournament that took place on the outdoor clay courts at the Stade Roland Garros in Paris, France. The tournament was held from 23 May until 5 June. It was the 92nd staging of the French Open, and the second Grand Slam tennis event of 1988.

Seniors

Men's singles

 Mats Wilander defeated  Henri Leconte, 7–5, 6–2, 6–1
It was Wilander's 6th career Grand Slam title, and his 3rd (and last) French Open title.

Women's singles

 Steffi Graf defeated  Natalia Zvereva, 6–0, 6–0 
This was the shortest women's singles Grand Slam final in the Open Era; Graf won the match in 32 minutes.
It was Graf's 3rd career Grand Slam title, and her 2nd (consecutive) French Open title.

Men's doubles

 Andrés Gómez /  Emilio Sánchez Vicario defeated  John Fitzgerald /  Anders Järryd, 6–3, 6–7, 6–4, 6–3

Women's doubles

 Martina Navratilova /  Pam Shriver  defeated  Claudia Kohde-Kilsch /  Helena Suková, 6–2, 7–5

Mixed doubles

 Lori McNeil /  Jorge Lozano defeated  Brenda Schultz-McCarthy /  Michiel Schapers, 7–5, 6–2

Juniors

Boys' singles
 Nicolás Pereira defeated  Magnus Larsson, 7–6, 6–3

Girls' singles
 Julie Halard defeated  Andrea Farley, 6–2, 4–6, 7–5

Boys' doubles
 Jason Stoltenberg /  Todd Woodbridge defeated  Cristiano Caratti /  Goran Ivanišević, 7–6, 7–5

Girls' doubles
 Alexia Dechaume /  Emmanuelle Derly defeated  Julie Halard /  Maïder Laval, 6–4, 3–6, 6–3

Prize money

Total prize money for the event was FF20,963,950.

References

External links
 French Open official website